Mechili is a small village in Cyrenaica, Libya and the site of a former Turkish fort.

Geography
Because of its location in the desert, Mechili suffered in the past from isolation. However, its isolation ended after paving the Charruba–Timimi desert road between the years 1975–1985, and this road became the preferred route for travel between Tobruk to Benghazi. The village sits at an elevation of 196 meters (643 feet).

World War II
In January 1941, the British force named “Western Desert Force” under command of General Richard O’Connor (after taking Tobruk on 22 January) executed a daring outflanking movement and took Mechili from Italian forces on 27 January.
On 7 April the same year, the Italian armoured division Ariete captured the British garrison at Mechili as a part of German Lieutenant General Erwin Rommel’s  first offensive through Cyrenaica with the goal of encircling the British forces, and this helped in capturing O’Connor near Derna the same month.
On 18 December 1941, British forces re-took Mechili as a part of Operation Crusader.
In early February 1942, Rommel’s forces again took Mechili as a part of his second offensive through Cyrenaica.
In November 1942, the British forces occupied Mechili for the last time.

Citations

References
Kenneth Macksey, "Beda Fomm : The Classic Victory",Ballantine Books, New York, 1971.
Peter Young(ed.), "The History of World War II", vols. no.4 & 8, Orbis Publication,1984.
Derek Jewell (ed.), “Alamein and the Desert War”, Times Newspapers, Sphere Books, 1967.

Populated places in Derna District
Cyrenaica